A crocodile clip or alligator clip is a plier-like spring-tensioned metal clip with elongated, serrated jaws that is used for creating a temporary electrical connection. This simple mechanical device gets its name from the resemblance of its serrated jaws to the toothed jaws of a crocodile or alligator. It is used to clamp and grab onto a bare electrical cable to an lead on a battery or some other electrical component. Functioning much like a spring-loaded clothespin, the clip's tapered, serrated jaws are forced together by a spring to grip an object. When manufactured for electronics testing and evaluation, one jaw of the clip is typically permanently crimped or soldered to a wire, or is bent to form the inner tubular contact of a ~ female banana jack, enabling quick non-permanent connection between a circuit under test and laboratory equipment or to another electrical circuit. The clip is typically covered by a plastic shroud or "boot" to prevent accidental short-circuits.

Large versions of these clips, called automotive clips or battery clamps, are made of solid copper for low electrical resistance, and are used with thick insulated copper cables to make connections between automobile batteries. These jumper cables (a.k.a. 'jump leads') are capable of delivering hundreds of Amperes of current needed to directly power an automobile starter motor, or to transfer energy from a charged lead–acid battery to a discharged one.

Specifications 
The United States Defense Logistics Agency specifies several types of electrical clips in Commercial Item Description (CID) A-A-59466. In this CID document, crocodile clips are designated type CC, alligator clips are designated types TCx, and other types of electrical clips have various other, unique designations.

Other uses 
 Dentistry: crocodile clips are often used on the ends of a cord in dental offices to attach a protective bib over the patient's clothing.
 Laboratory: crocodile  clips are frequently used to quickly and cheaply assemble or modify experimental circuits. They are useful for connecting components to wires.
 Education: like their laboratory use, crocodile clips are sometimes used with batteries, small lightbulbs and other small electrical devices in schools to teach students about electricity.
 Fencing: crocodile  clips are used in fencing to connect to participants' lamé vests to touch-detection systems.
 Hobby: crocodile clips can be used as miniature clamps to hold parts together for gluing or soldering (e.g., Helping hands tool).
 Camping: crocodile clips may be designed to attach a rope to a tarp or other sheet of material. (While this serves the same purpose as a grommet, it may lead to premature wear at the point of attachment.)
 Drug use: as a roach clip for holding burning cannabis to avoid burning fingers.
 Erotic use: as a clamp upon one's nipples for sexual gratification.   See nipple clamp for more information on this usage.
 Film/animation: useful for airborne scenes in possible stop-motion or holding models of any sort in mid air.
 Electronics: useful as a heat sink while soldering heat-sensitive devices.

Kelvin clip 

A Kelvin clip is a special form of crocodile clip. The jaws of a Kelvin clip are insulated from each other, allowing two isolated wires to connect to a single test point. This enables 4-wire measurement of circuits with very low resistances.

References

External links 

Historical catalogs
 Battery / Radio / Connecting Clips - 1929 Allied Radio catalog, page 46
 Alligator / Battery / Spring Clips - 1932 Lafayette catalog, page 76 / 81
 Alligator / Battery / Test Clips - 1939 Allied Radio catalog, page 38 / 137 / 138
 Alligator /  Crocodile Clips - 1940 Allied Radio catalog, page 181 / 182
 Alligator / Crocodile Clips - 1940 Radio Shack catalog, page 85

Historical patents
  U.S. Patent 55524 Test Clip - filed in 1919 by R.S. Mueller
 U.S. Patent 1521903 Connection Clip - filed in 1921 by R.S. Mueller
 U.S. Patent 1779442 Electrical Connection Clip - filed in 1925 by R.S. Mueller
 U.S. Patent 1999613A Connecting Clip - filed in 1934 by R.S. Mueller
 U.S. Patent 6623314B1 Kelvin clamp for electrically coupling to a battery contact - filed in 2002 by Midtronics Inc.

Historical trademarks
 Pee-Wee - filed in 1925 by Mueller Electric - (current products)
 MINI-GATOR - filed in 1955 by Mueller Electric - (current products)

Electrical connectors

ja:ワニグチクリップ